Stacked Deck is the debut album by American country rock group the Amazing Rhythm Aces, released in 1975 on the ABC label.  The album was recorded at the Phillips Recording Studio in Memphis, Tennessee and was produced by group member Barry "Byrd" Burton.  Most of the material was composed by the group's lead singer Russell Smith.

Stacked Deck reached #11 on the US country chart and #120 on the Billboard albums chart.  It includes the group's biggest hit single, "Third Rate Romance", which peaked at #11 country and #14 pop, and did even better in Canada where it topped both the country and pop chart.  "Amazing Grace (Used to Be Her Favorite Song)" was also released as a single and made #9 on the country chart, although it stalled at #72 on the pop chart.

Stacked Deck has become a very highly regarded album, and has been given the maximum five-star rating on the Allmusic website.

Track listing 

(All tracks written by Russell Smith unless stated)

 "Third Rate Romance" 3:17
 "The 'Ella B'" 4:33
 "Life's Railway to Heaven" 4:20
 "The Beautiful Lie" (Butch McDade) 2:54
 "Hit the Nail on the Head" 2:22
 "Who Will the Next Fool Be" (Charlie Rich) 2:48
 "Amazing Grace (Used to Be Her Favorite Song)" 3:17
 "Anything You Want" (Russell Smith, James H. Brown Jr.) 3:48
 "My Tears Still Flow" 3:25
 "Emma-Jean" 2:47
 "Why Can't I Be Satisfied" 3:03
 "King of the Cowboys" (Russell Smith, James H. Brown Jr.) 4:01

Musicians  
 Russell Smith, Rhythm guitar
 Jeff "Stick" Davis, Bass
 Butch McDade, Drums
 Barry "Byrd" Burton, Lead guitar 
 James Hooker, Piano
 Billy Earheart, Organ and piano
 
 Jim Kershaw, Lead guitar on Emma-Jean

Recording  
Recorded at Sam Phillips Recording Studio, Memphis, TN
Produced and Engineered by Barry "Byrd" Burton
Album photography, Jim McCrary
Album design, Martin McDonald

References 

The Amazing Rhythm Aces albums
1975 debut albums
ABC Records albums